Lineas the largest private rail freight operator in Europe with headquarters in Belgium and sites in France, Germany, Italy, the Netherlands and Spain. The Federal Holding and Investment Company (Federale Participatie- en Investeringsmaatschappij) holds 10% of the shares. Private equity group Argos Wityu and the management of Lineas together hold the remaining 90%.

Lineas is responsible for the transport of goods by rail. The company has proclaimed its ambition to realise a ‘modal shift’ in Europe, moving freight off the road and onto rail.

In 2014, Lineas launched the Green Xpress Network (GXN) with 23 rail connections between European stations. GXN combines different types of freight into a single train.

History
In 2005, the European Union gave the green light for the liberalisation of rail transport. Following this decision, the National Railway Company of Belgium (NMBS/SNCB) was restructured into the NMBS/SNCB-Group, consisting of three companies: NMBS/SNCB, Infrabel and NMBS/SNCB-Holding. Until 2011, rail freight transport activities were a division of NBMS/SNCB, which operated under the name B-Cargo. Under NMBS/SNCB, B-Cargo was a loss-making division. In 2011, B-Cargo became a subsidiary called NMBS/SNCB Logistics. Privatisation took place in 2015, under the name B Logistics and with investments from the independent private equity group Argos Wityu. Prior to privatisation, the company was not profitable. Afterwards, profitability increased. In 2017, B Logistics changed its name to Lineas.

Products and services
Lineas offers products and services for freight transportation throughout Europe. The organisation offers logistics services, including first and last mile delivery by rail, truck or inland waterway and GXN long distance. Other services of the company are: maintenance, fleet management, fleet advice, wagon and locomotive rental, picking, technology and training. The different types of transport are: block train, single wagonload (distributed transport), intermodal units, pallets, exceptional transport and the Green Xpress Network. The Green Xpress Network (GXN) offers 23 rail connections between European economic hubs. GXN combines different types of freight of large and small volumes into a single train.

Fleet
As at 2017, Lineas had more than 7,000 wagons and 250 locomotives.

Wagons

Steel wagons
 Shimm(n)s for cold coils
 Shimm(n)s for hot coils
 Remms for slabs

Bulk wagons
 Tads for limestone
 Fal(n)s for coal
 Eaos & Fas for scrap

Intermodal / container wagons
 Lgnss 40’
 Sgnss 60’
 Sggnss 72’
 Sggrss 80’

Locomotives
 Alstom Electric Type 13 (BFLU)
 Bombardier Traxx (DABNL)
 Bombardier Traxx (DBF)
 EMD Class 66 (DBNL)
 Siemens-Vossloh Diesel Type 77 (DBNL)
 SNCF Class BB 75000 (F)
 SNCF Class BB 27000 (F)
 MaK / Vossloh G1206

Organisation
Lineas employs more than 2,100 people.

The company has proclaimed its ambition to realise a ‘modal shift’ in Europe, moving freight off the road and onto rail, to improve the supply chain of companies and address societal issues caused by traditional trucking such as mobility issues, climate impact due to high carbon emissions, health hazards due to air pollution, and unnecessary road casualties.

In June 2020, Lineas won the Voka Sustainable Business Charter (VCDO). As a result of the charter, the company was the first Belgian transport company to receive the United Nations Institute for Training and Research (UNITAR) Certificate for Sustainable Business in October 2020. Lineas was also appointed Sustainable Development Goals (SDG) Pioneer for Sustainable development by the United Nations.

In 2019, Lineas doubled the capacity on the trains in and out of Antwerp to alleviate the impact of the works on the Oosterweel Link on Belgian mobility. The rail freight operator today removes 5,300 containers per week from Antwerp's road traffic (compared to 2,600 before).

In 2020, Geert Pauwels won the European Railway Award. He received the award because of the transformation of a loss-making division of the Belgian railways into a profitable private rail freight operator.

On 9 April 2020, Lineas unveiled a white locomotive, the 'Heroes Loc', in the Port of Antwerp as a tribute to heroes in the fight against the coronavirus, as well as to address problems in the railway sector caused by the COVID-19 pandemic.

Activities in Europe
Lineas has offices in Belgium, France, Germany, Italy, the Netherlands and Spain. The company is also active in Austria, the Czech Republic, Liechtenstein, Poland, Romania, Slovakia, Sweden and Switzerland. In Belgium, there are daily rail connections between Antwerp, Genk, Ghent, La Louvière, Liège and Zeebrugge. At the European level, Lineas is the largest private rail freight operator. Lineas develops its international and Green Xpress Network with mixed conventional and intermodal connections, as well as block trains for companies.

Rail Freight Forward
Lineas is a member of Rail Freight Forward, the coalition of European rail freight companies aiming to reduce the negative impact of freight transport on mobility, climate and the environment by shifting freight from road to rail. The coalition aims to increase the modal share of rail freight in Europe from 18% in 2020 to 30% by 2030. 

Lineas is also a member of the Belgian Rail Freight Forum. In France, the company is part of the 4F, the Fret Ferroviaire Français du Futur. In Germany, it is a member of the NEE, the Netzwerk Europäischer Eisenbahnen.

European Rail Freight Association
In February 2020, Lineas became a member of the European Rail Freight Association (ERFA). The coalition aims to play a role in creating a common, fully liberalised and competitive European rail freight market.

References

External links

Rail freight transport in Belgium
Railway companies of Belgium
Rail freight companies